Cherif Traorè (born 10 April 1994) is a Guinea-born Italian rugby union footballer. His usual position is as a prop, and he currently plays for Benetton.

Background
Traorè was born in Kindia, Guinea. He has two brothers and a sister. His brothers Mohamed Lamine and Abdoulaye both play association football professionally. When Traorè was young, his father immigrated to Italy before bringing his family over to join him. Traorè was seven years old when he arrived in Italy. His father had emigrated to Europe earlier and "because he missed his wife and children so much, he decided to move us all over". Traorè arrived speaking French but had no knowledge of Italian or the country. He made friends at school who invited him to their homes and helped him adjust.

After passing through the Viadana youth academies, he was then selected for the F.I.R. Academy.

Professional
In 2013 he was hired by I Cavalieri Prato for whom he made his debut in the Italian championship of Excellence and in the European Challenge Cup. After a season in Prato he returned to Viadana where he played in the 2014-2015 championship.

In 2015 Traorè was signed by Benetton Rugby for whom he made his debut in the Pro12 and in the European cup.

After a season in which he made 9 appearances in the Pro12 and Champions Cup, in December 2016 he was hindered by a shoulder injury that forced him to miss most of the season. Returning from injury after an operation, in the 2017-2018 season he increased his playing time while almost always starting from the bench as a frontline change, scoring his first try in the Pro14 victory against the Southern Kings. In the following season, following his debut in the senior national team and though limited by an injury, he confirmed himself as a first team regular.

International
Traorè was part of the Italy national under-20 rugby union team from 2012 to 2014.
At the age of 19, the Parma player joined the Under 20s and participated in the Six Nations tournament in 2013 and 2014 and was called up for the editions of the world championship in the same years.

He has also been part of the Italy national team squad since 2018. After participating in training for the 2018 Six Nations Championship, Traorè was called up by technical commissioner Conor O'Shea for the summer tour of the Italian national team in Japan where he made his international debut, replacing Andrea Lovotti in the victory against Japan on June 16 in Kobe. He then also played in all the autumn test matches.

On the 14 October 2021, he was selected by Alessandro Troncon to be part of an Italy A 28-man squad for the 2021 end-of-year rugby union internationals.

References

External links

1994 births
Living people
Italian rugby union players
Italy international rugby union players
Italian sportspeople of African descent
Guinean emigrants to Italy
People from Kindia
Rugby union props
Rugby Viadana players
Benetton Rugby players
Sportspeople from the Province of Reggio Emilia